The following equivalent ratings in the Merchant Navy were those officially recognised by the National Maritime Board for British Merchant Navy ocean-going cargo vessels carrying up to six passengers in 1919, 1943, and 1964. They are listed in ascending order of seniority.

"Mixed" crew refers to crews that consisted of both white and non-white (African or Asian) members, as was common on British-registered ships, which often had white officers and (sometimes) petty officers, and non-white crew. These tables would probably only have related to white ratings. However, for these purposes, non-white ratings of European, American, or West Indian origin would probably have been considered "white".

The Merchant Navy Ratings Pension Fund (MNRPF) defined benefits scheme was set up in 1978 to provide pensions for retired Merchant Navy ratings.

Footnotes

See also
British Merchant Navy

British Merchant Navy